Robert Fico's Third Cabinet was government of Slovakia, headed by prime minister Robert Fico. It replaced Fico's Second Cabinet on 23 March 2016 following the 2016 parliamentary election, in which Fico's Direction – Social Democracy party lost its parliamentary majority, and met for the first time on March 30. It consists of 15 members including the prime minister, and was originally composed of four parties: Smer–SD, the Slovak National Party, the Slovak-Hungarian Most–Híd party, and the Network party. Most of the elected MPs of Network party joined Most-Híd shortly after the elections and the party is currently dissolved.

On 15 March 2018, in the wake of the political crisis following the murder of Ján Kuciak, Fico delivered his resignation to President Andrej Kiska. New cabinet led by Peter Pellegrini was appointed on 22 March 2018.

Breakdown by party nomination

Composition
After the dissolution of the government on the 22 March 2018, most of the ministers stayed on their positions, and continued in the new cabinet of Pellegrini.

Notes
(SD) Smer–SD nominee(SNS) Slovak National Party nominee

See also 
Fico's First Cabinet

References

Government of Slovakia
2016 establishments in Slovakia
Cabinets established in 2016
Direction – Social Democracy
Slovak government cabinets
Cabinets disestablished in 2018
2018 in Slovakia